Robert S. Barnett is a former Secretary of the Pennsylvania Office of Administration, a position he held from 2003 to 2004.

References

Living people
State cabinet secretaries of Pennsylvania
Pennsylvania State University alumni
University of Virginia School of Law alumni
1950 births